The anime series Neuro: Supernatural Detective is based on the manga series of the same name written and illustrated by Yūsei Matsui, directed by Hiroshi Kōjina and co-produced by Madhouse, Nippon Television, Shueisha, D.N. Dream Partners and VAP. The episodes follow Neuro Nogami: a demon who depends on mysteries for sustenance and, after solving all the mysteries in the demonic world, comes to Earth to solve its mysteries. Nero does this undetected by using a detective office and a high-school student, Yako Katsuragi, as a facade.

Production of the Neuro: Supernatural Detective anime was announced on July 14, 2007 in issue 33 of Shueisha's magazine, Weekly Shōnen Jump. The series originally aired between October 2, 2007 and March 25, 2008 on Nippon Television; it was later broadcast by four NTV affiliates: HTV, YTV, CTV and STV. The episodes were later combined into nine DVDs, released by VAP from December 21, 2007 to August 27, 2008; VAP re-released all the episodes in a DVD box set on September 30, 2008. 

Viz Media announced its acquisition of Neuro: Supernatural Detective for North American release in the March 2011 issue of its magazine, Shonen Jump. The company renamed the series from Majin Tantei Nōgami Neuro to Neuro: Supernatural Detective, streaming the English-subtitled episodes from February 18, 2011, to July 1, 2011 on its website VizAnime.com and Hulu.

Production team
Neuro: Supernatural Detective was originally created by Yūsei Matsui as a manga; the anime series was animated by Madhouse and directed by Hiroshi Kōjina. The series was composed by Satoshi Suzuki, its characters were designed by Mika Takahashi in collaboration with Studio Live staff, and Takahashi and Ai Kikuchi were the principal animation directors. Ayako Kurata directed the opening theme, and Tomohiko Itō directed the ending theme; their animation was directed by Takahashi and Kikuchi, respectively. Hidetoshi Kaneko was the art director, Yoshinori Horikawa coordinated the colors, Kōji Takahashi directed the photography and Satoshi Terauchi edited the series. The sound was directed by Toshihiko Nakajima, recorded by Fujio Yamada at Tricycle Studio and sound effects were created by Yasunori Ogata at Sound Box.

Episode list

DVD releases
VAP released nine DVDs between December 21, 2007 and August 27, 2008. A DVD box set with all 25 episodes was released on September 30, 2008.

See also
List of Neuro: Supernatural Detective chapters

References

Neuro: Supernatural Detective